Béoumi Department is a department of Gbêkê Region in Vallée du Bandama District, Ivory Coast. In 2021, its population was 195,015 and its seat is the settlement of Béoumi. The sub-prefectures of the department are Ando-Kékrénou, Béoumi, Bodokro, Kondrobo, Lolobo, Marabadiassa, and N'Guessankro. It is the geographical center of the country.

History
Béoumi Department was created in 1988 as a first-level subdivision via a split-off from Bouaké Department.

In 1997, regions were introduced as new first-level subdivisions of Ivory Coast; as a result, all departments were converted into second-level subdivisions. Béoumi Department was included in Vallée du Bandama Region.

In 2011, districts were introduced as new first-level subdivisions of Ivory Coast. At the same time, regions were reorganised and became second-level subdivisions and all departments were converted into third-level subdivisions. At this time, Béoumi Department became part of Gbêkê Region in Vallée du Bandama District.

Notes

Departments of Gbêkê
1988 establishments in Ivory Coast
States and territories established in 1988